Rivière du Nord is a -long river in the Laurentides region that flows into the Ottawa River.  The river begins as the outlet of Lac Brulé where it passes near Sainte-Agathe-des-Monts and flows southeasterly. Quebec Autoroute 15 follows the course of the Rivière du Nord valley north of Montréal providing access to many cottages and vacation homes. At Saint-Jérôme, the river turns southwesterly where it continues to its mouth on the left bank of the Ottawa River. In addition to Saint-Jérôme, towns built along the Rivière du Nord's banks include Val-David, Val-Morin, Saint-Adèle, Prévost, and Lachute.

Development along the Rivière du Nord valley was largely at the hands of François-Xavier-Antoine Labelle, a Catholic priest who constructed a railway along the river. This railway was later converted into a rail trail called the P'tit Train du Nord in the 1990s.

The oldest bridge over the river was constructed by William Shaw (1805–1894) near the village of Shawbridge, now part of the town of Prévost.

References

Rivers of Laurentides